Tegs SK is a Swedish football club located in Umeå. The club was founded in 1898.

Background
Tegs SK is a sports club that was founded in 1898. The club has specialised in ice-hockey, football and orienteering. In 1987 the club's football section was merged with the football section of Sandåkerns SK to become Umeå FC.  However Tegs SK has re-introduced its football programme.

Football 
Since their foundation Tegs SK has participated mainly in the lower divisions of the Swedish football league system.  The club currently plays in Division 4 Södra Västerbotten. They play their home matches at the Tegstunets IP in Umeå.

The club is affiliated to the Västerbottens Fotbollförbund.

Season to season

Attendances

In recent seasons Tegs SK have had the following average attendances:

Ice hockey 

See Tegs SK (ice hockey).

Footnotes

External links
 Tegs SK – Football website

Sport in Umeå
Football clubs in Västerbotten County
Orienteering clubs in Sweden
Association football clubs established in 1898
1898 establishments in Sweden